This article contains a list of Web archiving initiatives worldwide. For easier reading, the information is divided in three tables: web archiving initiatives, archived data, and access methods.

This Wikipedia page was originally generated from the results obtained for the research paper A survey on web archiving initiatives published by the Arquivo.pt (the Portuguese web-archive) team.

Web archiving initiatives

Archived data

Access methods

See also
 Wikipedia:List of web archives on Wikipedia

References

External links 
 List of member archives - International Internet Preservation Consortium
 Repository created by the Webrecorder project that contains a socially constructed experimental list of publicly available archives